Édgar Diminich (born April 29, 1991) is a world class sailor from Ecuador.

He began sailing Optimists and became Southamerican champion in 2004 when he was 12 years old. Two years later, in 2006, he won the bronze medal at the Optimist World Championship.  

Next, he was the Laser Radial Cressy Champion in Florida in 2008, the Laser National Champion in Ecuador in 2009, and he placed 4th in the Laser South Americans in Brazil in 2010.

In 2012 he won the Snipe North American Championship as a crew of Raúl Ríos and in 2016 he won the Snipe Western Hemisphere & Orient Championship as a skipper, with Jaime Flores. In 2016, he also was second at the Sunfish Worlds.

Bolivarian Games
 Gold medal at Sucre 2009 in Sunfish.
 Gold medal at Trujillo 2013 in Snipe with Juan José Ferretti Ramírez.

Bolivarian Beach Games
 Bronze medal at Lima 2012 in Snipe with Juan José Ferretti Ramírez.
 Silver medal at Huanchaco 2014 in Snipe with Jaime Santos.

References

External links
Profile Juegos Panamericanos 

1991 births
Ecuadorian male sailors (sport)
Laser class sailors
Living people
Optimist class sailors
Pan American Games competitors for Ecuador
Sailors at the 2015 Pan American Games
Snipe class sailors
Sunfish class sailors